Leszek Engelking (2 February 1955 – 22 October 2022) was a Polish poet, short story writer, novelist, translator, literary critic, essayist, Polish philologist, and literary academic, scholar, and lecturer.

Engelking translated a vast amount of  literature into Polish, from Spanish, English, Russian, Ukrainian, Belarusian, Slovak but in particular from Czech.

Biography

Education, editorial, and academic career
Engelking was born in Bytom in 1955 and spent his childhood in Upper Silesia. In 1979, Engelking graduated from Warsaw University, he received his doctorate in 2002 and postdoctoral degree in 2013. From 1984 to 1995, he was a member of an editorial staff of "Literatura na Świecie" ("Literature in the World"), a Polish monthly devoted to foreign literature. From 1997 to 1998, he was a lecturer at Warsaw University and a visiting professor at Palacký University, Olomouc (Czech Republic). He taught at the University of Łódź.

Literary Memberships
Engelking was a member of Association of Polish Writers since 1989, the Polish PEN Club since 2000, and of the Société Europeénne de Culture since 1994.

Engelking was also an associate of the American journal Paideuma (which is devoted to Ezra Pound), the Czech journal Slavia, and the Polish monthly Tygiel Kultury.

Poetic career

He has published collections of poems:
 Autobus do hotelu Cytera (A Bus to the Cythera Hotel, 1979)
 Haiku własne i cudze (Haiku by Myself and Others, 1991)
 Mistrzyni  kaligrafii i inne wiersze (The  Mistress of Calligraphy and Other Poems, 1994)  
 Dom piąty (The Fifth House, 1997) 
 I inne wiersze (And Other Poems, 2000; new and selected poems) 
 Muzeum dzieciństwa (Museum of Childhood, 2011) 
 Komu kibicują umarli?, (For Which Team Do the Deceased Root?, 2013) 

A selection of his poems have appeared in Ukrainian translation (Vid ciogho ne vmirayut’/You Can't Die from This; 1997), as well as in Czech (Jiné básně a jiné básně/Other Poems and Other Poems; 1998) and Slovak (Zanechala si odtlačky prstov na mojej koži/You have Left Finger-Marks on My Skin; 2005). A small collection of his poems was published in Spanish (Museo de la infancia/Museum of Childhood; 2010, ; depósito legal Z-42-2010).

Short story and monograph writer career
Engelking's book of short stories Szczęście i inne prozy (Good Fortune and Other Stories) appeared in 2007, .

Engelking published the following monographs: Vladimir Nabokov (1989), Vladimir Nabokov - podivuhodný kouzelník (1997, in Czech) and Chwyt metafizyczny. Vladimir Nabokov - estetyka z sankcją wyższej rzeczywistości (2011, The Metaphysical Device: Vladmir Nabokov – Aesthetics with the Sanction of Higher Reality), Surrealism, underground, postmodernizm. Szkice o literaturze czeskiej (2001), Codzienność i mit. Poetyka, programy i historia Grupy 42 w kontekstach dwudziestowiecznej awangardy i postawangardy (2005), Nowe Mity. Twórczość Jáchyma Topola (2016, The New Myths. The Literary Oeuvre of Jáchym Topol), and Bytom w literaturze (2018, Bytom in Literature).

Engelking edited the anthology of British and American poetry Wyspy na jeziorze (1988, The Lake  Isles), the anthology of Czech poetry Maść przeciw poezji (2008, Ointment against Poetry), the selection from the works of three contemporary Slovak poets, Oleg Pastier, Karol Chmel, and Ivan Kolenič, Oko za ząb (2006, An Eye for a Tooth ), as well as the anthology of imagist poetry Obraz i wir (2016, Image and Vortex, Andrzej Szuba was a joint editor of the book).

Literary translator career
He has translated works by Nabokov, Daniela Hodrova, Jáchym Topol, Ezra Pound, Miroslav Holub, Charles Bukowski, Christopher Reid, Nikolay Gumilyov, Petr Mikeš, Ivan Wernisch, Ivan Blatný, Agneta Pleijel, Oldřich Wenzl, Richard Caddel,  Jaroslav Seifert, Václav Burian, Egon Bondy, Maximilian Voloshin, David A. Carrión, Gerardo Beltrán, W.B. Yeats, Pavol Országh Hviezdoslav, Jiří Kolář, Karel Čapek, Basil Bunting, Amy Lowell, Hilda Doolittle, William Carlos Williams, Langston Hughes, Kerry Shawn Keys, sor Juana Ines de la Cruz, Federico García Lorca, Abel Murcia, Sergey Zavyalov, Iryna Zhylenko, Lina Kostenko, and Andrei Khadanovich.

Engelking's selection of short stories by Ladislav Klíma appeared in 2004 (Jak będzie po śmierci [How It Will Be after Death]), his translation of Michal Ajvaz’s book of poems, short stories and a novel was published in 2005 (Morderstwo w hotelu Intercontinental. Powrót starego warana. Inne miasto The Murder in the Intercontinental Hotel. The Return of the Old Comodo Dragon. Other City). Ajvaz's novel Voyage to the South in his translation appeared in 2016 (Podróż na Południe).

Personal life and death
Engelking's son, Wojciech Engelking is also a writer. Leszek privately was a fan of motorcycle speedway, football team Polonia Bytom, liked lager beer, and Armani perfumes.

Engelking died on 22 October 2022, at the age of 67.

Honours
 The Award of "Literatura na Świecie" for translation (1989, 2003, 2009, 2018),
 The Award of Polish Translators’ and Interpreters’ Society (2000)
 Premia Bohemica (the Czech prize; 2003)
 Polish PEN Club Award (2010)

References

External links
   Leszek Engelking - Łódź University, Poland
   Leszek Engelking - www.rasyk.lt
   Leszek Engelking - "Fakta ze života Bohumila Hrabala", Listy (Olomouc) 5/2004
    "About art of translation" - Interviev with Leszek Engelking
 Two Engelking's poems in English translation

Sources
 Barbara Tyszkiewicz, Leszek Engelking. [In:] Polscy pisarze i badacze literatury przełomu XX i XXI wieku, vol. 2, ed. Alicja Szałagan, Polish Academy of Sciences, Warsaw 2024.  (in Polish)

1955 births
2022 deaths
Polish poets
Polish male short story writers
Polish short story writers
Polish translators
English–Polish translators
Recipients of the Decoration of Honor Meritorious for Polish Culture
Translators from Czech
Translators from Slovak
Translators from Spanish
Translators from Russian
Translators from Belarusian
Translators from English
Translators from Ukrainian
Translators from Polish
Translators to Polish
People from Bytom
University of Warsaw alumni
Polish male poets